Kariki is a rural locality (a village) in Klyazminskoye Rural Settlement, Kovrovsky District, Vladimir Oblast, Russia. The population was 48 as of 2010.

Geography 
Kariki is located 30 km northeast of Kovrov (the district's administrative centre) by road. Sannikovo is the nearest rural locality.

References 

Rural localities in Kovrovsky District